The Jan van Amstel class was a class of nine minesweepers of the Royal Netherlands Navy, built to serve in the Dutch East Indies and Dutch territorial waters in Europe.

The class was originally planned to consist of 12 ships, but because of the German occupation of the Netherlands in the Second World War, three of the four ships that were still under construction were never completed.

The ships could also be used as minelayers. The construction of the ships took place in two different shipyards, four by Gusto, Schiedam and five by P. Smit, Rotterdam.

Ships in class 
  : Commissioned 1937. Sunk 8 March 1942.
  : Commissioned 1937. Scuttled 6 March 1942.
  : Commissioned 1937. Royal Australian Navy 26 August 1942–5 May 1943. Decommissioned 1961. Museum ship July 1997.
  : Commissioned 1937. Scuttled 8 March 1942.
  : Commissioned 1937. Sunk 8 September 1939.
  : Commissioned 1937. Scuttled 14 May 1940. Kriegsmarine 1940–1945. Recommissioned 1946. Struck 1961. Sold for scrap.
  : Commissioned 1937. Royal Navy 26 March 1943–1946. Struck 1961. Scrapped.
  : Commissioned 1937. Scuttled 14 May 1940. Kriegsmarine 1940–1944. Destroyed 20 August 1944. 
  : Captured before commissioning. Kriegsmarine 1940–1945. Commissioned 1946. Struck 1961. Scrapped.

See also
 List of minesweepers of the Royal Netherlands Navy

Sources
 Netherlandsnavy.nl : Jan van Amstel-class 
 U-boat.net

Mine warfare vessel classes
 
 
 
 Auxiliary gateship classes